Bart Leysen (born 10 February 1969) is a Belgian retired road racing cyclist. He competed at the 1998 and 1999 Tour de France. He is the father of Senne Leysen.

Results at the Grand Tours

Tour de France 
 1998 : 92º
 1999 : 133º
 2001 : Did not finished

Vuelta a España 
 1995 : 78º
 1996 : 77º

References

1969 births
Living people
People from Herentals
Belgian male cyclists
Cyclists from Antwerp Province